Alfonso Gesualdo di Conza (20 October 1540 – 14 February 1603) was an Italian Cardinal starting in 1561. He was from Calitri, not far from Naples.  His attendance at the papal conclave of 1565-1566 at the age of only 25 makes him one of the youngest Cardinals ever to participate in a papal election.

He was Archbishop of Conza in 1564, Bishop of Albano in 1583, Bishop of Frascati in 1587, Bishop of Porto e Santa Rufina in 1589, Bishop of Ostia in 1591, and Archbishop of Naples in 1596.

He was a patron of Sant'Andrea della Valle in Rome, the mother church of the Theatine Order. The composer Carlo Gesualdo was his nephew.

Episcopal succession

Notes

External links
Biography
Catholic Hierarchy page 
 Biography
 Biography

1540 births
1603 deaths
Cardinal-nephews
16th-century Italian cardinals
Cardinal-bishops of Albano
Cardinal-bishops of Frascati
Cardinal-bishops of Ostia
Cardinal-bishops of Porto
Deans of the College of Cardinals
Archbishops of Sant'Angelo dei Lombardi-Conza-Nusco-Bisaccia
Clergy from Campania
people from Calitri